Skyguard is a chemical laser-based area defense system proposed by Northrop Grumman, to protect airports and other areas against a variety of military threats including short-range ballistic missiles, short- and long-range rockets, artillery shells, mortars, unmanned aerial vehicles and cruise missiles.  Each shot costs about $1,000 which represents the cost of consumable chemicals.

See also
 Tactical High Energy Laser, a joint American-Israeli laser system for missile defense.
 Iron Dome, missile system deployed in Israel
 Skyshield, Swiss short range air defence system

References

External links
 Northrop Grumman Develops Skyguard Laser Defense System For Local Defense
 Popular Science Reviews Skyguard - With Video Popular Science

Military lasers
Missile defense